Miftah may refer to:

People

Given name
 Md. Miftah Uddin Choudhury, Bangladeshi judge
 Miftah al-Osta Omar, Libyan politician
 Miftah Anwar Sani, Indonesian professional footballer
 Miftah Ismail, Pakistani politician and political economist
 Miftah Muhammed K'eba, Libyan politician
 Mustafa Miftah Bel'id al-Dersi, Libyan politician
 Hasunal Miftah Israfani, a member of the Indonesian girl group Cherrybelle

Surname
 Abdul Baqi Miftah, Algerian Islamic scholar of Sufism
 Hicham Miftah, Moroccan footballer

Other
 Al Miftah District, a district of the Hajjah Governorate in Yemen

See also
 Meftah (disambiguation)

Arabic-language surnames